Caroline Fournier (born 7 May 1975) is a retired Mauritian athlete who competed in the discus and hammer throw. She represented her country at the 2000 Summer Olympics in Sydney without reaching the final. She was a two-time African champion in the hammer throw and was also a gold medallist at the 1999 All-Africa Games. Fournier also was twice runner-up in the discus at the African Championships and once runner-up in the hammer.

She has personal bests of 51.54 metres in the discus and 62.06 metres in the hammer, both set in 1996. Both results are also standing Mauritian records.

Competition record

References

External links
 

1975 births
Living people
Mauritian hammer throwers
Mauritian discus throwers
Female hammer throwers
Female discus throwers
Olympic athletes of Mauritius
Athletes (track and field) at the 2000 Summer Olympics
Commonwealth Games competitors for Mauritius
Athletes (track and field) at the 1998 Commonwealth Games
Athletes (track and field) at the 2002 Commonwealth Games
Mauritian female athletes
African Games gold medalists for Mauritius
African Games bronze medalists for Mauritius
African Games medalists in athletics (track and field)
World Athletics Championships athletes for Mauritius
Athletes (track and field) at the 1995 All-Africa Games
Athletes (track and field) at the 1999 All-Africa Games